Sarajevo days in Belgrade (Serbo-Croatian:Dani Sarajeva/Дани Сарајева) a multi-day cultural event that, since 2007, is organized every year in the Serbian capital Belgrade in memory of Siege of Sarajevo. The initiator of the festival launch was regional Youth Initiative for Human Rights.

Since the beginning in 2006, Yugoslav Drama Theatre participate in the organization of the festival.

See also
Siege of Sarajevo
Serbian culture
Culture of Bosnia and Herzegovina
Culture in Belgrade

References

External links
Danisarajeva.com

2007 establishments in Serbia
Festivals established in 2007
Festivals in Serbia
Culture in Belgrade
Siege of Sarajevo
Culture in Sarajevo